A number of sailing ships have been named Eliza.

 , a 10-ton (bm) long boat that disappeared off the coast of Victoria, Australia in 1797.
  was launched in America in 1780 and taken in prize in 1782. Under British ownership she made nine slave voyages between 1783 and her loss in 1797. In total, she had embarked 3769 slaves and landed 3013, for a loss rate of 18.7%.
The voyages of the next three ships are often confused,
 was a 236-ton (bm) ship launched at New Brunswick in 1789 that made six or so voyages as a South Seas whaler, and afterwards one voyage as a slave ship; she then disappears from online records.
 , a 268-ton (bm) ship launched in Spain in 1794, captured c.1800, that made one voyage for the  British East India Company (EIC), and one as a whaler, and then became a West Indiaman; she was sold to Portuguese interests in 1810 and is last listed as Courier de Londres in 1814.
 , of 264 tons (bm), was a French prize that made nine voyages as a whaler between 1802 and 1822. She is last listed in 1824.
  was launched in Philadelphia and came into British ownership in 1802. She was briefly a privateer sailing out of Liverpool. A highly valuable prize that she captured in 1805, in company with another privateer, resulted in a court case in which Elizas captain successfully sued a captain in the British Royal Navy for having pressed some of her crew. Eliza spent the great bulk of her career as a merchantman, either as a coaster or in sailing between England and the western coast of the Iberian Peninsula. She was last listed in 1820.
 , a 512/538-ton (bm) merchant ship built in British India in 1804, probably in Calcutta, that made five voyages transporting convicts to Australia and one voyage for the EIC. She became waterlogged in 1836 and her crew abandoned her at sea. 
 , a 135-ton (bm) merchant ship built in Providence, Rhode Island that was wrecked SSW off Nairai Island, Fiji in 1808. 
 , a 200-ton merchant ship built in Calcutta, British India in 1811, that made two voyages transporting convicts from Calcutta to Australia before she wrecked in 1815.
 , a 391-ton merchant ship built in Java, Netherlands East Indies in 1815. She made two voyages transporting convicts from England to Australia. She was last listed in 1848.
 was built in Calcutta, India, in 1816. She performed many voyages between England and India under a license from the British East India Company (EIC), and then as a free trader. She also made one voyage on behalf of the EIC. She was still listed in 1860.
 , was a 344-ton (bm) merchant ship built at Prince Edward Island, Canada in 1824. She made one voyage transporting convicts from Hobart Town to Sydney. She was last listed in 1843.

Ship names
Age of Sail merchant ships of England